Darrin James Hodgetts is a New Zealand psychology academic. He is a professor of societal psychology at Massey University and is a principal investigator with Ngā Pae o te Māramatanga. Of Māori descent, Hodgetts affiliates to the Ngāi Tahu iwi.

Hodgetts's research and supervision is in the field of social psychology, looking homeless and working class communities identity, health and poverty.

Selected publications

Journal articles
 Radley, Alan, Darrin Hodgetts, and Andrea Cullen. "Visualizing homelessness: A study in photography and estrangement." Journal of Community and Applied Social Psychology 15.4 (2005): 273–295.
 Hodgetts, Darrin, et al. "Health inequalities and homelessness considering material, spatial and relational dimensions." Journal of Health Psychology 12.5 (2007): 709–725.
 Hodgetts, Darrin, et al. "A trip to the library: Homelessness and social inclusion." Social & Cultural Geography 9.8 (2008): 933–953.
 Hodgetts, Darrin, et al. "Constructing health news: possibilities for a civic-oriented journalism." Health: 12.1 (2008): 43–66.
  Hodgetts, Darrin, Andrea Cullen, and Alan Radley. "Television characterizations of homeless people in the United Kingdom." Analyses of Social Issues and Public Policy 5.1 (2005): 29–48.

Books
 Urban Poverty and Health Inequalities: A Relational Approach (with Ottilie Stolte, Routledge, 2017)
 Social Psychology and Everyday Life (with Drew, Sonn, Stolte, Nikora, and Curtis, Red Globe 2010 and Springer 2019)

Edited volumes
 The SAGE Handbook of Applied Social Psychology (edited with Kieran O'Doherty, SAGE, 2019)

References

External links
 Prof Darrin Hodgetts, Massey University

Living people
Year of birth missing (living people)
Academic staff of the Massey University
Ngāi Tahu people
New Zealand Māori academics
Academic staff of the University of Waikato
Academics of the London School of Economics
New Zealand psychologists
Social psychologists
Māori and Pacific Island scientists